Jung Woo-young (born 14 December 1989) is a South Korean footballer who plays as a midfielder for Qatar Stars League club Al Sadd and the South Korea national team.  He was part of the South Korean Olympic team that won bronze at the 2012 Summer Olympics.

Career
In May 2018 he was named in South Korea's preliminary 28 man squad for the 2018 FIFA World Cup in Russia.

Career statistics

Club
Last update: 25 February 2023.

1Includes Promotion Playoffs to J1,  Qatari Super Cup, Qatar Cup and FIFA Club World Cup.

International goals
Scores and results list South Korea's goal tally first.

Honours

Club
Al-Sadd
Qatar Stars League (3): 2018–19, 2020–21, 2021–22  
Emir of Qatar Cup (2): 2020, 2021
Sheikh Jassem Cup: 2019
Qatar Cup (2): 2020, 2021

International
South Korea U23
Olympic Bronze Medal: 2012

South Korea
EAFF East Asian Cup (2): 2015, 2017

References

External links
 
 
 
 

1989 births
Living people
Association football midfielders
South Korean footballers
South Korea under-23 international footballers
South Korea international footballers
South Korean expatriate footballers
Kyoto Sanga FC players
Júbilo Iwata players
Vissel Kobe players
Chongqing Liangjiang Athletic F.C. players
Al Sadd SC players
J1 League players
J2 League players
Qatar Stars League players
Chinese Super League players
Expatriate footballers in Japan
Expatriate footballers in China
Expatriate footballers in Qatar
South Korean expatriate sportspeople in Japan
South Korean expatriate sportspeople in China
South Korean expatriate sportspeople in Qatar
Footballers at the 2012 Summer Olympics
Olympic footballers of South Korea
Olympic medalists in football
Olympic bronze medalists for South Korea
Medalists at the 2012 Summer Olympics
Sportspeople from Ulsan
2018 FIFA World Cup players
2019 AFC Asian Cup players
2022 FIFA World Cup players